Written in the Rocks is an album by Canadian jazz pianist  Renee Rosnes which was released in 2016 by Smoke Sessions Records. It won the 2017 Juno Award for Solo Jazz Album of the Year.

References 

2017 albums
Juno Award-winning albums
Renee Rosnes albums